Year 933 (CMXXXIII) was a common year starting on Tuesday (link will display the full calendar) of the Julian calendar.

Events 
 By place 

 Europe 
 Spring – Hugh of Provence, king of Italy, launches an expedition to Rome to remove the Roman ruler (princeps) Alberic II and avenge his humiliation (see 932). It fails, however, as Roman civic militias repel the Lombard army. Hugh ravages the Italian countryside, before he withdraws to Pavia.
 March 15 – Battle of Merseburg: King Henry I ("the Fowler") defeats the Magyars near Merseburg after his refusal to pay the annual tribute. During Henry's lifetime they never raid the East Frankish Kingdom again.
 William I ("Longsword"), duke of Normandy, recognizes King Rudolph as his overlord. In turn he gives William the Cotentin Peninsula and the Channel Islands.

 England 
 Prince Edwin, the youngest son of the late King Edward the Elder, is drowned en route to the West Frankish Kingdom and buried at Saint Bertin.

 Africa 
 Fatimid forces fail to seize the Maghreb al-Aqsa (modern Morocco) from the local Berber tribes allied to the Spain-based Caliphate of Córdoba.

Births 
 Al-Hakim Nishapuri, Persian Sunni scholar (d. 1014)

Deaths 
 March 10 – Li Renfu, Chinese warlord and governor
 March 16 – Takin al-Khazari, Abbasid governor of Egypt
 November 21 – Al-Tahawi, Arab imam and scholar (b. 853)
 December 9  – Li Congrong, prince of Later Tang
 December 15 – Li Siyuan, emperor of Later Tang (b. 867)
 December 18 – Yaonian Yanmujin, Chinese empress dowager
 Acfred II, count of Carcassonne and Razès (France)
 Adelolf, count of Boulogne (approximate date)
 Alfonso IV, king of León and Galicia (Spain)
 Du Guangting, Chinese Taoist priest and writer (b. 850)
 Ealdred I, ruler ('king') of Bernicia (approximate date)
 Edwin, English prince and son of Edward the Elder 
 Fujiwara no Kanesuke, Japanese nobleman (b. 877)
 Harald Fairhair, king of Norway (approximate date)
 Ibn Duraid, Arab poet and philologist (b. 837)
 Mu'nis al-Muzaffar, Abbasid general
 Shaghab, mother and de facto co-ruler of Al-Muqtadir
 Tryphon, patriarch of Constantinople

References